Burlington is an unincorporated community in Multnomah County, in the U.S. state of Oregon. It is located southeast of Holbrook on U.S. Route 30 near its intersection with Cornelius Pass Road.

History
Burlington was platted in 1909. The community had a depot on the railroad. It was a station on the Oregon Electric Railway.

References

Unincorporated communities in Multnomah County, Oregon
1909 establishments in Oregon
Unincorporated communities in Oregon